Curahuara de Carangas is a small town in the Bolivian Oruro Department. It is the seat of the Sajama Province. In 2009 it had an estimated population of 1,581.

See also 
 Ch'iyar Quta
 Sajama
 Sajama National Park

References

Populated places in Oruro Department